Rowman & Littlefield Publishing Group is an independent publishing house founded in 1949. Under several imprints, the company offers scholarly books for the academic market, as well as trade books. The company also owns the book distributing company National Book Network based in Lanham, Maryland.

History
The current company took shape when the University Press of America acquired Rowman & Littlefield in 1988 and took the Rowman & Littlefield name for the parent company.

Since 2013, there has also been an affiliated company based in London called Rowman & Littlefield International. It is editorially independent and publishes only academic books in Philosophy, Politics & International Relations and Cultural Studies.

The company sponsors the Rowman & Littlefield Award in Innovative Teaching, the only national teaching award in political science given in the United States. It is awarded annually by the American Political Science Association for people whose innovations have advanced political science pedagogy.

Imprints
Alban (acquired 2014 from the Alban Institute)
AltaMira Press (acquired 1999 from SAGE Publications)
Amadeus Books (acquired 2018 from Hal Leonard)
Applause Theatre & Cinema Books (acquired 2018 from Hal Leonard)
 Ardsley House Publishers, Inc.
Backbeat Books (acquired 2018 from Hal Leonard)
Bernan Press (acquired 2008)
Bonus Books
Cowley Publications (acquired 2007 from the Society of St. John the Evangelist.)
General Hall (acquired 2000)
Globe Pequot Press (acquired 2014 from Morris Communications)
Down East Books (acquired by Rowman & Littlefield in 2013)
Falcon Guides
Gooseberry Patch (acquired 2015)
Lyons Press
Muddy Boots (launched 2016)
Pineapple Press (acquired 2018)
Stackpole Books (acquired 2015)
Taylor Trade (acquired by Rowman & Littlefield in 2001)
Bridge Works (acquired 2000)
Cooper Square Press (founded 1961 by Rowman & Littlefield, acquired 1988 by UPA)
Northland Publishing backlist (acquired in 2007)
including Rising Moon and Luna Rising imprints
Northword Books for Young Readers (acquired 2007)
Two-Can Publishing (acquired 2007)
The Derrydale Press (acquired 1999)
Madison Books (founded 1985 by UPA)
M. Evans (acquired 2005)
Roberts Rinehart (acquired 2000)
TwoDot Books
Government Institutes (acquired 2004)
Hal Leonard Books (acquired 2018 from Hal Leonard)
Hamilton Books (founded 2003)
Ivan R. Dee (acquired 1998)
Jason Aronson (acquired 2003)
Lexington Books (acquired 1998)
Limelight Editions (acquired 2018 from Hal Leonard)
Madison House Publishers (acquired 2000)
Newbridge Educational Publishing (acquired 2008 from Haights Cross)
Prometheus Books (acquired 2019)
Rowman & Littlefield Education or R&L Education (formerly Technomic Books, acquired 1999)
Rowman & Littlefield (acquired 1988 by UPA)
Philip Turner Books (founded 2009)
 Scarecrow Press (acquired 1995 by UPA from Grolier); founded by Ralph R. Shaw
Sheed & Ward (founded in the 1920s in London by Frank Sheed and his wife, Maisie Ward, both prominent in the Catholic Action movement; acquired 2002 from the Priests of the Sacred Heart)
SR Books (acquired 2004 from Scholarly Resources, Inc., of Wilmington, Delaware)
Sundance Publishing (acquired 2008 from Haights Cross)
University Press of America (founded 1975)
The World Today Series (acquired 2011 from Stryker-Post Publications)

Distribution
Bucknell University Press
Fairleigh Dickinson University Press
Lehigh University Press
University of Delaware Press
Smithsonian Institution Scholarly Press
C&T Publishing

See also
List of book distributors

References

Further reading

External links

Book publishing companies based in Maryland
Publishing companies established in 1949
1949 establishments in Maryland
Academic publishing companies
Lanham, Maryland
Publishing companies of the United States